Sverre S. Engen (January 28, 1911 – April 4, 2001) was a Norwegian-American skier, ski coach, ski area manager, and film-maker.

Biography
Engen was born in the town of Mjøndalen, in Buskerud county, Norway, the second son of Trond Sorli Engen and Martha Maranda Oen Engen. He had two brothers, Alf Engen (1909–1997) and Corey Engen (1916–2006), both of whom helped expand the sport of skiing in the intermountain U.S. Being the second son of a famous skiing father, Engen was naturally reared to ski. After his father died of the Spanish flu in 1918, his mother and brothers moved the short distance to small town Steinberg. At age 18, Sverre and older brother Alf (age 20) emigrated to the United States in 1929, first settling in Chicago, then relocating to Salt Lake City, Utah in 1931. Their widowed mother Martha and younger brother Corey (age 17) emigrated in 1933, joining Alf and Sverre in Utah.

Sverre Engen brought credit to Utah as a national ski jumping champion, ski resort operator and consultant, student of avalanche control, and as a pioneer of ski patrol work. His exploits include serving as Alta ski school director and as the first manager of the then-new Rustler Lodge at Alta, after being the first snow ranger at the resort in 1940. He helped build ski jumps named Ecker Hill, Parleys Canyon; Becker Hill, Ogden Canyon; and Landes Hill at Alta. Alta's Rustler Lodge was built by Sverre Engen and Howard Stillwell; opened in 1947, it was constructed on the site where the Alta General Store once stood.

Sverre was inducted into the National Ski Hall of Fame in 1971 for his "tremendous contribution to the growth of the sport of skiing." Among his credits is that of being coach of the University of Utah ski team when it won its first national collegiate championship in 1947. He also produced a series of skiing related films.

The Engen brothers helped to popularize skiing in the West, primarily in Utah and Idaho. All three are enshrined in multiple halls of fame, such as the National Ski Hall of Fame in Ishpeming. Sverre Engen died in 2001 at the age of 90. His older brother Alf died at age 88 in 1997, and younger brother Corey died in 2006 at age 90.

Films

References

 Atwater, Montgomery Meigs; Engen, Sverre (1947) Ski with Sverre: Deep Snow and Packed Slope Ski Technique New Directions OCLC 3401603
 Engen, Sverre (1976) Skiing a Way of Life: Saga of the Engen Brothers Scotlo Enterprise OCLC 4797836
Engen, Alan K. First Tracks: A Century of Skiing in Utah (Gibbs Smith, 2001)

External links
Alf Engen Ski Museum – Sverre Engen
U.S. Ski and Snowboard Hall of Fame – Sverre Engen
Skiing History.org
Alta's Rustler Lodge

1911 births
2001 deaths
People from Nedre Eiker
Norwegian emigrants to the United States
Utah Utes coaches
Norwegian male alpine skiers
American male alpine skiers
Sportspeople from Viken (county)